Mboya Edwards is a Canadian bodybuilder from Scarborough, Ontario.

List of accomplishments
2000 - Canadian Championships - CBBF, WelterWeight, 1st
2001 - North American Championships - IFBB, MiddleWeight, 2nd
2002 - Canadian Championships - CBBF, MiddleWeight, 1st
2003 - Canadian Championships - CBBF, MiddleWeight, 2nd
2005 - Canadian Championships - CBBF, Light-HeavyWeight, 2nd
2006 - Canadian Championships - CBBF, Light-HeavyWeight, 1st
2007 - Canadian Championships - CBBF, Light-HeavyWeight, 1st
2008 - Canadian Championships - CBBF, Light-HeavyWeight, 1st
2009 - Europa Texas International Competition - IFBB, 202 Class, 12th
2010 - Europa Texas International Competition - IFBB, 202 Class, 4th
2011 - Toronto Pro Supershow Competition - IFBB, 202 class, 2nd place [Olympia Qualifier] 
2011 - Mr. Olympia, 202 Class - IFBB, 15th Place

References

External links

Year of birth missing (living people)
Living people
Canadian bodybuilders